Andrej Šepetkovski join the cast.

Plot

In this season character of Momir's cousin Gvozden has become a regular cast member, also in Belgrade arrives Vuk's son Majkl who is not in very good relations with Vuk.

Cast

Episodes

Jelena (TV series)